Benedykt Kraskowski (1904, Biała Podlaska, Poland – 1944), was a Polish "Righteous Among the Nations" of German descent, with Jews he employed in his carpentry workshop.

Kraskowski, who lived in Biala Podlaska, hid Jews and procured forged identity documents for them. For those in hiding who wished to join the partisans, he provided money and food.

Kraskowski was killed by Ukrainian nationalists in 1944.

On December 16, 1986, for saving Jews, he was posthumously recognized as a Righteous among the Nations by Yad Vashem, the highest honor given to a non-Jew.

Footnotes

External links
 Benedykt Kraskowski, a Polish "Righteous Among the Nations"
 Dam im imię na wieki. Polacy z okolic Treblinki ratujący Żydów
 Benedykt Kraskowski – his activity to save Jews' lives during the Holocaust, at Yad Vashem website

1904 births
1944 deaths
People from Biała Podlaska
Polish Righteous Among the Nations